The Amazon–Orinoco–Southern Caribbean mangroves (NT1401) is an ecoregion along the coasts of Colombia, Venezuela, Guyana, Suriname, French Guiana and Brazil.

Location 

The Amazon-Orinoco-Southern Caribbean mangroves cover stretches of the northern, Caribbean, coasts of Colombia and Venezuela, and of the Atlantic coasts of Venezuela, Guyana, Suriname, French Guiana and northeast Brazil.
It includes sections of the coasts of the Brazilian states of Amapá, Pará and Maranhão.
The eastern part of the ecoregion makes up the  Guianan–Amazon Mangroves global ecoregion, which in turn is made up of the Guianan mangroves, Amapá mangroves, Pará mangroves, and Maranhão mangroves terrestrial ecoregions.

Along the Caribbean coast the mangroves are found along sections of Guajira–Barranquilla xeric scrub, Sinú Valley dry forests, Paraguana xeric scrub, Lara–Falcón dry forests, La Costa xeric shrublands, Cordillera de la Costa montane forests, Araya and Paria xeric scrub, Orinoco wetlands and Orinoco Delta swamp forests, which extend along the coast into the Atlantic.  
Along the Atlantic coast the mangroves are found along sections of Guianan moist forests, Paramaribo swamp forests, Uatuma–Trombetas moist forests, Guianan savanna, Marajó várzea, Tocantins–Araguaia–Maranhão moist forests, Maranhão Babaçu forests and Northeastern Brazil restingas.

Ecology 
The  ecoregion is in the Neotropical realm and the mangrove biome.

Climate 
The Köppen climate classification is "Af": equatorial, fully humid.

Flora 
The Guianan–Amazon Mangroves have five species of mangroves, often distributed into different zones of salinity.
There are also bushes and marches with dense, tall grasses.

Fauna 
The Guianan–Amazon Mangroves support very diverse populations of fish and migratory birds, as well as other wildlife.
Typical species of fauna include scarlet ibis (Eudocimus ruber), American flamingo (Phoenicopterus ruber), magnificent frigatebird (Fregata magnificens), loggerhead sea turtle (Caretta caretta), hawksbill sea turtle (Eretmochelys imbricata), green sea turtle (Chelonia mydas), leatherback sea turtle (Dermochelys coriacea), West Indian manatee (Trichechus manatus), American crocodile (Crocodylus acutus), and giant otter (Pteronura brasiliensis).

Endangered mammals include black-headed spider monkey (Ateles fusciceps), white-cheeked spider monkey (Ateles marginatus), black bearded saki (Chiropotes satanas), cotton-top tamarin (Saguinus oedipus) and giant otter (Pteronura brasiliensis).
Endangered amphibians include Lesser Antilles robber frog (Pristimantis urichi).
Endangered reptiles include green sea turtle (Chelonia mydas), hawksbill sea turtle (Eretmochelys imbricata), Miyata's scaly-eyed gecko (Lepidoblepharis miyatai), Kemp's ridley sea turtle (Lepidochelys kempii) and Maranhão slider (Trachemys adiutrix).
Endangered birds include sapphire-bellied hummingbird (Lepidopyga lilliae).

Status 
The World Wildlife Fund classes the Guianan–Amazon Mangroves as "Relatively Stable/Intact".
Threats include urbanization, industrial pollution and agricultural sediments.

Protected areas include the Archipiélago Los Roques National Park, Bush Bush Wildlife Sanctuary, Caroni Swamp Wildlife Sanctuary, Central Range Wildlife Sanctuary, Imataca Forest Reserve, Kronstadt Island Wildlife Sanctuary, Mochima National Park, Morrocoy National Park, Northern Range Wildlife Sanctuary, Trinity Hills Wildlife Sanctuary, Valencia Wildlife Sanctuary.

References

Bibliography 

 
 
 

Amazon biome
Neotropical ecoregions
Ecoregions of Brazil
Ecoregions of Colombia
Ecoregions of Venezuela
Ecoregions of South America
Mangrove ecoregions